Arhopala agrata, or de Nicéville's oakblue, is a species of lycaenid or blue butterfly found in Southeast Asia (Manipur - Myanmar, Singapore, Peninsular Malaya, Sumatra, Java, Nias, Assam, Myanmar, Thailand, Mergui, Borneo, Pulau Laut, Palawan and the Philippines). The species was first described by Lionel de Nicéville in 1890.

References

External links
 With images.

Arhopala
Butterflies of Asia
Taxa named by Lionel de Nicéville
Butterflies described in 1890